Kintambo is a municipality (commune) in the Lukunga district of Kinshasa, the capital city of the Democratic Republic of the Congo.

It is situated in the northwest of the city of Kinshasa, at the junction of Boulevard du 30 Juin (or more accurately its short extension, Avenue du Colonel Mondjiba), Avenue Kasa-Vubu and Route de Matadi.

Demographics

References

See also

Communes of Kinshasa
Lukunga District